Hörður Magnússon may refer to:

 Hörður Björgvin Magnússon (born 1993), Icelandic footballer
 Hörður Magnússon (footballer, born 1966), Icelandic footballer